Henry Stanhope may refer to:

 Henry Stanhope, Lord Stanhope (died 1634), English nobleman and politician
 Henry Edwyn Stanhope (1754–1814), Royal Navy officer

See also
 Henry Scudamore-Stanhope (disambiguation)